Tomé is a port city and commune in the Biobío Region of Chile. It is bordered by Coelemu to the north, Ránquil and Florida to the east, Penco to the south, and the Pacific Ocean to the west. The local economy is based mainly on textile manufacturing and fishing industry.

History

27 February 2010 quake
The 8.8 magnitude 27 February 2010 earthquake greatly affected Tome, Constitucion, Concepcion, Talcahuano.

Demographics
Of these, 45,959 (87.6%) lived in urban areas and 6,481 (12.4%) in rural areas. The population grew by 6.4% (3,156 persons) between the 1992 and 2002 censuses.

The commune includes the localities of Rafael, Menque, Cocholgüe, Punta de Parra and Dichato.

Education
Previously the area had a German school, Deutsche Schule Tomé. The City has many good primary schools and high schools. Universidad de Concepción, one of the best universities of Chile is 30 minutes away.

Notable people
 Erasmo Moena - murderer and suspected serial killer

References

External links
  Municipality of Tomé

Communes of Chile
Populated places in Concepción Province
Populated places established in 1544
1544 establishments in the Spanish Empire